Interview is a 2003 Dutch drama film, directed by Theo van Gogh, starring Katja Schuurman and Pierre Bokma. The film is about a war correspondent having an interview with a soap opera actress.

Katja Schuurman was nominated for a Golden Calf for Best Actress at the 2003 Netherlands Film Festival.

Steve Buscemi's remake of the same name premiered in 2007.

Laurence Postma's Hindi remake Cover Story was released in August 2011.

Plot
War correspondent Pierre Peters (Pierre Bokma) is sent by the newspaper he works for to interview soap opera actress Katja (Katja Schuurman). The film describes what happens during the interview inside the house of Katja and also what happens right before and after outside the house.

Cast
Katja Schuurman as Katja
Pierre Bokma as Pierre Peters
Theo Maassen as Theo
Ellen ten Damme as Ellen
Michiel de Jong as a soap opera actor
Tinoes Fenanlamrer as a police officer
Monique Meijer as a police officer

Background
The idea for the film was from Hans Teeuwen and the screenplay was written by Theodor Holman. Director Theo van Gogh describes in an interview that he had four wishes for the film: "At first the roles of the interviewer and the person being interviewed had to change slightly. I wanted Pierre Bokma for the role of the journalist and three turns in the scenario. And Katja had to win."

References

External links
Official website 

2003 films
2003 drama films
2000s Dutch-language films
Films directed by Theo van Gogh
Dutch drama films